Frank Wilde "Fritz" Henrich (May 8, 1899 – May 1, 1959) was an outfielder in Major League Baseball. He played for the Philadelphia Phillies in 1924.

External links

1899 births
1959 deaths
Major League Baseball outfielders
Philadelphia Phillies players
Williamsport Grays players
Baseball players from Cincinnati
Saint Joseph's Hawks baseball players